"One Night at a Time" is a song written by Roger Cook, Eddie Kilgallon, and Earl Bud Lee, and recorded by American country music singer George Strait.  It was released in March 1997 as the first single from his album Carrying Your Love with Me.  The song reached the top of the U.S. Billboard Hot Country Songs chart.

Critical reception
Billboard magazine reviewed the song favorably, saying that while it has a little more pop-leaning production than a normal Strait record, the melody is "pretty and the flourishes of Mexicali-sounding guitar riffs add an intriguing flavor", going on to say that the song has a "light summertime feel to it."

Chart positions
"One Night at a Time" debuted at number 37 on the U.S. Billboard Hot Country Singles & Tracks for the week of March 15, 1997.

Year-end charts

References

1997 singles
1996 songs
George Strait songs
Song recordings produced by Tony Brown (record producer)
Songs written by Roger Cook (songwriter)
MCA Nashville Records singles